Hot Wires is a 1987 album by American guitarist and blues musician Roy Buchanan. This was his third record for Alligator Records. It was recorded by Justin Niebank and mixed by Niebank and Tim Hale with Brian Poer and David Axelbaum assisting. It was mastered by Tom Coyne and produced by Roy Buchanan, Dick Shurman, Justin Niebank and Bruce Iglauer. This was Buchanan's final studio album. He killed himself the following year.

Track listing
 "High Wire" 
 "That Did It" 
 "Goose Grease" 
 "Sunset over Broadway" 
 "Ain't No Business" 
 "Flash Chordin'" 
 "25 Miles"
 "These Arms of Mine"
 "Country Boogie"
 "The Blues Lover"

Personnel
Roy Buchanan – guitar and vocals
Larry Exum – bass guitar  
Morris Jennings – drums 
Stan Szelest – keyboards
Donald Kinsey – guitar 
Johnny Sayles – vocals
Kanika Kress – vocals

References

1987 albums
Roy Buchanan albums
Albums produced by Bruce Iglauer
Alligator Records albums